The Voice of the Blood (Italian: La voce del sangue) is a 1952 Italian melodrama film directed by Pino Mercanti.

Cast
 Paul Muller as Count Franco Sampieri
 Franca Marzi as Elsa Di Lauro
 Otello Toso as Carlo Mattei
 Evi Maltagliati as  Giulia Scala
 Lyla Rocco as Lucia
 Enrico Glori as Gabriele
 Filippo Scelzo as Donato Scala
 Roberto Risso as Sergio Scala
 Lia Orlandini as Lucia's Mother
 Jone Morino

External links
 

1952 films
1950s Italian-language films
Films directed by Pino Mercanti
Melodrama films
Italian drama films
1952 drama films
Italian black-and-white films
1950s Italian films